Indirect elections for the o le Ao o le Malo (head of state) were held in Samoa on 23 August 2022. Incumbent Tuimalealiʻifano Vaʻaletoʻa Sualauvi II was the only candidate, and was re-elected unanimously. He had been nominated by Prime Minister Fiamē Naomi Mataʻafa.

References

Elections in Samoa
Samoa
O le Ao o le Malo election
Uncontested elections